Dragon Lady is usually a stereotype of certain East Asian and occasionally South Asian and/or Southeast Asian women as strong, deceitful, domineering, mysterious, and often sexually alluring. Inspired by the characters played by actress Anna May Wong, the term comes from the female villain in the comic strip Terry and the Pirates. It has since been applied to powerful women from certain regions of Asia, as well as a number of Asian and Asian American film actresses. The stereotype has generated a large quantity of sociological literature. "Dragon Lady" is sometimes applied to persons who lived before the term became part of American slang in the 1930s. "Dragon Lady" is one of two main stereotypes used to describe women, the other being "Lotus Blossoms". Lotus Blossoms tend to be the opposite of the Dragon Lady stereotype, having their character being hyper-sexualized and submissive. Dragon Lady is also used to refer to any powerful but prickly woman, usually in a derogatory fashion.

Background

Although sources such as the Oxford English Dictionary list uses of "dragon" and even "dragoness" from the 18th and 19th centuries to indicate a fierce and aggressive woman, there does not appear to be any use in English of "Dragon Lady" before its introduction by Milton Caniff in his comic strip Terry and the Pirates. The character first appeared on December 16, 1934, and the "Dragon Lady" appellation was first used on January 6, 1935. The term does not appear in earlier "Yellow Peril" fiction such as the Fu Manchu series by Sax Rohmer or in the works of Matthew Phipps Shiel such as The Yellow Danger (1898) or The Dragon (1913). However, a 1931 film based on Rohmer’s The Daughter of Fu Manchu, titled Daughter of the Dragon, is thought to have been partly the inspiration for the Caniff cartoon name. Wong plays Princess Ling Moy, a version of Fu Manchu's daughter Fah Lo Suee.

Page Act of 1875 

The Page Act of 1875 limited the number of Chinese women allowed to immigrate into the United States, barring women from China, Japan, or any other Asian origin to enter the USA. This was a part of the Anti-Chinese movement. That later became the Chinese Exclusion Act that prevented Chinese laborers from entering the USA from 1882 until it was repealed in 1943. It was thought that Chinese women bring prostitution. The Page Act was intended to control the Chinese American population. According to film historian  Celine Parrenas Shimizu, in the early twentieth century most Chinese women in America were treated as prostitutes and this bled into American mainstream media, using the promiscuous image of the Dragon Lady as a way to denigrate Asian American women; they were sex objects to be exploited but not good enough to be American wives.

Terry and the Pirates

Terry and the Pirates was an action-adventure comic strip created by cartoonist Milton Caniff. Joseph Patterson, editor for the Chicago Tribune New York Daily News Syndicate, hired Caniff to create the new strip, providing Caniff with the idea of setting the strip in the Orient. A profile of Caniff in Time recounts the episode:

Patterson... asked: "Ever do anything on the Orient?" Caniff hadn't. "You know," Joe Patterson mused, "adventure can still happen out there. There could be a beautiful lady pirate, the kind men fall for." In a few days Caniff was back with samples and 50 proposed titles; Patterson circled Terry and scribbled beside it and the Pirates.

Caniff's biographer R. C. Harvey suggests that Patterson had been reading about women pirates in one of two books (or both) published a short time earlier: I Sailed with Chinese Pirates by Aleko Lilius and Vampires of the Chinese Coast by Bok (pseudonym for unknown). Women pirates in the South China Sea figure in both books, especially the one by Lilius, a portion of which is dedicated to the mysterious and real-life "queen of the pirates" (Lilius’ phrase), named Lai Choi San. "Lai Choi San" is a transliteration from Cantonese, the native language of the woman, herself—thus, the way she pronounced her own name. Caniff appropriated the Chinese name, Lai Choi San, as the "real name" of his Dragon Lady, a fact that led both Lilius and Bok to protest. Patterson pointed out that both books claimed to be non-fiction and that the name belonged to a real person; thus, neither the fact of a woman pirate nor her name could be copyrighted. (Neither Bok nor Lilius had used the actual term "Dragon Lady".) Sources are not clear on whether it was Patterson or Caniff who coined that actual term, though it was almost certainly one of the two.

Usage

Since the 1930s, when "Dragon Lady" became fixed in the English language, the term has been applied countless times to powerful East, Southeast and South Asian women, such as Soong Mei-ling, also known as Madame Chiang Kai-shek, Madame Nhu of Vietnam, Devika Rani of India, and to any number of Asian or Asian American film actresses. That stereotype—as is the case with other racial caricatures—has generated a large quantity of sociological literature.

Today, "Dragon Lady" is often applied anachronistically to refer to persons who lived before the term became part of American slang in the 1930s.  For example, one finds the term in recent works about the  "Dragon Lady" Empress Dowager Cixi (Empress Dowager Tzu-hsi), who was alive at the turn of the 20th century, or references to Chinese-American actress Anna May Wong as having started her career in the 1920s and early 1930s in "Dragon Lady" roles. In both these cases, however, articles written in the early 1900s about the Empress Dowager or reviews of Wong’s early films such as The Thief of Bagdad (1924) or Daughter of the Dragon (1931)—reviews written when the films appeared—make no use of the term "Dragon Lady".<ref>For example, the review of Daughter of the Dragon" in The New York Times, August 22, 1931.</ref>  (One writer, however, did refer to the Empress Dowager as "a little lady Bismarck.") Today’s anachronistic use of "Dragon Lady" in such cases may lead the modern reader to assume that the term was in earlier use than appears to be the case.

Anna May Wong was the contemporary actress to assume the Dragon Lady role in American Cinema in the movie Daughter of the Dragon, which premiered in 1931. Josef von Sternberg's 1941 The Shanghai Gesture contains a performance by Ona Munson as 'Mother' Gin Sling, the proprietor of a gambling house, that bears mention within presentations of the genre. Contemporary actresses such as Michelle Yeoh in Tomorrow Never Dies may be constrained by the stereotype even when playing upstanding characters. These actresses portrayed characters whose actions are more masculine, sexually promiscuous, and violent. Lucy Liu is a 21st century example of the Hollywood use of the Dragon Lady image, in her roles in Charlie’s Angels, Kill Bill, and Payback. Other American films in which Asian women are hyper-sexualized include The Thief of Baghdad, The Good Woman of Bangkok, and 101 Asian Debutantes, where Asian women are portrayed as prostitutes. Miss Saigon is an American musical with examples of this as well.

 Hollywood costuming 

Dragon Lady characters are visually defined by their emphasis on "otherness" and sexual promiscuity. An example of headwear for Dragon Lady costumes is the Hakka hat or other headdresses with eastern inspiration. For body wear, traditionally Dragon Ladies have been put in sexualized renditions of the cheongsam. Examples of this in The World of Susie Wong include Nancy Kwan's character in cheongsam that accentuates her hips and breasts.

See also
 Angry black woman
 Dragon Ladies: Asian American Feminists Breathe Fire Ethnic stereotype
 Ethnic stereotypes in comics
 Femme fatale

 Stereotypes of South Asians
 Tiger mother
 Xiaolongnü

 Explanatory notes 
1. Lady Bracknell in Oscar Wilde's The Importance of Being Earnest, 1895, is described in such tones and the playwright all but uses the word dragon''. She  is "perfectly unbearable. Never met such a Gorgon ... I don’t really know what a Gorgon is like, but I am quite sure that Lady Bracknell is one. In any case, she is a monster, without being a myth ..."

References

Further reading

Additional Milton Caniff bibliography
 
 
 
 

Asian-American issues
Slang terms for women
Stereotypes of East Asian people
Stereotypes of women
Female stock characters